The 1991 Colonial Athletic Association men's basketball tournament was held March 2–4 at the Richmond Coliseum in Richmond, Virginia. 

Richmond defeated fourth-seeded  in the championship game, 81–78, to win their fourth (and second consecutive) CAA men's basketball tournament. The Spiders, therefore, earned an automatic bid to the 1991 NCAA tournament, where they advanced to the Second Round after upsetting .

Bracket

References

Colonial Athletic Association men's basketball tournament
Tournament
CAA men's basketball tournament
CAA men's basketball tournament
Sports competitions in Virginia
Basketball in Virginia